Game feel (sometimes referred to as "look feel" or "game juice") is the intangible, tactile sensation experienced when interacting with video games. The term was popularized by the book Game Feel: A Game Designer's Guide to Virtual Sensation written by Steve Swink.  The term has no formal definition, but there are many defined ways to improve game feel. The different areas of a game that can be manipulated to improve game feel are: input, response, context, aesthetic, metaphor, and rules.

Game feel is usually attributed to spatial games whose mechanics involve controlling the movement of objects or characters. Since the majority of games are spatial, studies involving game feel mainly focus on the movement and physical interactions between objects in games. The goal of good game feel is to immerse the player in an engaging and rewarding experience. A way to test game feel is to see if interacting with a game's most basic mechanics feels satisfying.  At minimum, the game should feel engaging to play even after the plot, points, level design, music, and graphics are removed; if it is not, then the game may suffer from poor game feel.

Input 
Input is the means by which a player can control the game.  The physical input device used by the player has an effect on game feel; for instance, using a joystick to control movement feels natural because the joystick itself offers physical feedback.  In other cases, like with touchscreens, the input device can offer little feedback and be cumbersome for the player to use.

Game feel can be improved by using a control scheme that is easily understood by the player.  Natural mappings allows a game designer to connect a game's movement mechanics to an input device.  Realistic racing games, like Gran Turismo, make the most sense when using a racing wheel controller; in this case the input device directly matches the game's movement mechanics.  Arcade cabinets often have unique controls to better relate to their movement mechanics.  For example, Centipede uses a trackball as its main input; the inclusion of a trackball allows the player to move in all directions with ease, which is the main focus of the game's mechanics.  

Input sensitivity also plays a role in game feel.  Sensitivity is defined as a "rough measure of the amount of expressiveness inherent in a particular input device."  Each different controller has a unique inherent sensitivity, and because of that the pairing of controller and game can have a dramatic impact on game feel.  A game that requires precision being matched with a low-sensitivity controller can make the game hard to play or even frustrating.

Response 
Response is how the game interprets and reacts to player input.  In general, response in good game design involves controls that have a low delay and high sensitivity (also called responsive controls).  If the delay between input and response is noticeable to the player, the game can be seen as sluggish and unwieldy.  

Response is also how the game converts the player's simple input to more complex expressions of movement.  For example, the controller on the Nintendo Entertainment System has a very simple directional-pad and two on-off buttons, but games like Super Mario Bros. took the simple input and allowed the player's expressions to be complex, fluid, and deliberate.

Context 
Input and response require an environment that gives meaning to the player's actions.  If the player has the ability to move the character in interesting ways, the environments in the game should reflect that and give the player interesting situations to play in.  For instance, a racing game that focuses on careful steering and managing speed around corners would not be engaging if the race track was a wide, straight line; a track with slopes, bends, straights, and hairpin turns creates interesting scenarios for the player to interact with.

Aesthetic 
Aesthetics (also referred to as "polish") is the extra details that influence the player's senses.  Since games are primarily focused on sight and sound (graphics and music/sfx), aesthetics amplify both the visuals and the audio of the game to make the overall experience more engaging to the player.

Visual 
Visual aesthetics add details to the game world that make it feel more vibrant and connected.  Visual details can subconsciously inform the player of the subtle interactions between the objects in the game world.  Simple examples include adding particle effects, like dirt being kicked up by the game character's feet or water splashing  from a pool, can enhance the inherent connection between physical objects in the game world.

Visual effects can also improve game feel by introducing extra spectacle and dazzling the player.  Vivid colors and bright aesthetics can make a game feel alive, and adding effects like bright flashes, sparks, explosions, debris, and camera shake enhances the impact of events in the game.

Sound 
Sound effects emphasize the interactions between objects in the game.  Having weak or quiet sound effects can lead to the game objects feeling weak and less impactful.  If the sounds themselves are low quality, it can be especially distracting to the player.  Good game feel requires appropriate, impactful, and pleasing (non-repetitive) sound effects.

Music can also have a big effect on game feel.  Game music's main purpose is to reinforce the main mood or tone of the game.  Action games generally use loud and bombastic scores to emphasize the feeling of power and triumph, and horror games generally use subtle, tense music with loud spikes to drive home moments of intensity.

Metaphor 
Metaphor in game feel refers to how the game mechanics relate to the game's theme.  If the game involves things the player understands, the player will bring preconceived notions of how those things should behave.  For instance, a realistic driving simulator game carries expectations of how the cars should handle; if you swap the model of the car out with a model of a fat running man (without changing the controls or movement) the game feels completely different and the previous expectations are no longer present.

References

External links 
 Steve Swink's Game Feel book official website
 Game Feel: Why Your Death Animation Sucks by Nicolae Berbese at GDC Europe 2015.
 Juice it or lose it a talk by Martin Jonasson & Petri Purho

Video game terminology
Video game design